The Clasico FVCiclismo Corre Por la VIDA was an elite men's and women's professional one-day road bicycle race held in Venezuela, rated by the UCI as a 1.2 race.

Past winners

Men's race

Women's race

References 

Cycle races in Venezuela
Women's road bicycle races
Men's road bicycle races
2004 establishments in Venezuela
Recurring sporting events established in 2004
2016 disestablishments in Venezuela
Recurring sporting events disestablished in 2016